This list of the tallest residential buildings in Dubai ranks buildings whose occupiable height is at least 90 percent devoted to residential use. The tallest residential building in Dubai is Princess Tower which stands , completed in 2012 surpassing 23 Marina, also in Dubai, and currently stands as second tallest residential building in the city. Elite Residence completed in 2011 is the third tallest residential building while The Marina Torch is the fourth tallest residential building.
Since 2005 there is a construction burst of residential towers in Dubai; that results in many record-breaking residential towers in Dubai, besides the completed towers some residential towers are under construction, the tallest one is Pentominium, which was expected to be completed in 2013, but as of 2012 the construction has been halted due to lack of finances, if completed it will become the world's tallest residential building. Most of the residential buildings in Dubai are located in Dubai Marina.

Ranking criteria and alternatives
The non-profit international organization Council on Tall Buildings and Urban Habitat (CTBUH), formed in 1969, decides which structure is "The World's Tallest Building" and sets the standards by which buildings are measured. It maintains a list of 50 tallest completed residential buildings in Dubai.

In 1996, in response to a dispute over whether the Petronas Towers or the Willis Tower (formerly the Sears Tower) was taller, the council listed and ranked buildings in four categories: the height of the structural or architectural top, the height of the highest occupied floor, the height to the top of the roof (removed as a category in November 2009),
 and the height to the top of any part of the building. A tall building's "tallest" rank therefore depends on its spires and antennas as well as the height of its architectural top. For example, the Petronas Towers, with its spire, is ranked higher than the Willis Tower with its antennas, despite the Petronas Towers' lower roof.

Completed

An equal sign (=) following a rank indicates the same height between two or more buildings.

Under construction
This list contains residential buildings in Dubai that are at least  in height and are either currently under construction or on-hold. It does not include completed, topped-out, approved or proposed skyscrapers.

See also
 List of tallest buildings in the world
 List of tallest buildings in Dubai
 List of tallest residential buildings in the world

Notes
A. Construction is currently on-hold due to lack of finances.
B. Topped out in 2012, expected completion in 2013.

References
General
 CTBUH.com
 Emporis.com - Dubai

Specific

 emirates crown
 bright start tower
 1century tower
 altayer tower
 alfattan tower1
 street tower
 alseef tower
 lereve
 marinah8s tower
 marina crown
 horizon tower
 lake terrace
 murjan tower
 mesk tower
 marina terrace

Dubai, Residential

Tallest, Dubai
Tallest, Dubai
Residential